Glidden may refer to:

Places
In Canada
 Glidden, Saskatchewan

In the United States
 Glidden, Iowa
 Glidden Township, Carroll County, Iowa
 Glidden, Texas, an unincorporated community
 Glidden, Wisconsin, an unincorporated community

Other uses
 Glidden (surname)
 Glidden (paints), a paint manufacturing company

See also
 Glidden Tour